The 2002 European Road Championships were held in Bergamo, Italy, between 2 August and 4 August 2002. Regulated by the European Cycling Union. The event consisted of a road race and a time trial for men and women under-23.

Schedule

Individual time trial 
Friday 2 August 2002
 Women under-23
 Men under-23

Road race
Sunday 4 August 2002
 Women under-23
 Men under-23

Events summary

Medal table

References

External links
The European Cycling Union

European Road Championships, 2002
Road cycling
European Road Championships by year
International cycle races hosted by Italy